Beast Coast is an American hip hop collective and supergroup from Brooklyn, New York, formed in 2012 by the members of Pro Era, Flatbush Zombies, and the Underachievers. The collective has been on multiple tours together, and their debut group album Escape from New York was released on May 24, 2019.

History
Beast Coast was formed in 2012, but the relationships within the group members date back to the time growing up together in the Brooklyn neighborhoods of Flatbush and Bedford–Stuyvesant. Pro Era formed their collective while attending Edward R. Murrow High School. The Underachievers and Zombie Juice became acquainted through a childhood friend of AK the Savior. The co-founder of Pro Era, Capital STEEZ, died by suicide in December 2012, followed by the death of ASAP Yams in 2015.

In 2019, the supergroup released three singles ahead of their debut album, Escape from New York, released on May 24, 2019. The group also announced a North American tour beginning on July 23 and ending on August 16.

Members

Current
 Joey Badass
 Kirk Knight
 CJ Fly
 Meechy Darko
 Zombie Juice
 Erick Arc Elliott
 AK the Savior
 Issa Gold
 Nyck Caution
 Powers Pleasant
 Aaron Rose
 Chuck Strangers
 Dessy Hinds
 Dirty Sanchez
 J.A.B.
 Jakk The Rhymer
 Rokamouth
bigboywrld

Former
 Capital Steez

Discography

Studio albums

Singles

Other charted songs

References

American hip hop groups
Hip hop collectives
Musical groups established in 2012
East Coast hip hop groups
Hip hop supergroups
2012 establishments in New York City
Hip hop groups from New York City